Marconi Ribeiro Souza (born 22 June 1988 in Teixeira de Freitas, Bahia) is Brazilian footballer who currently plays for Floresta. His older brother Ademir is a footballer who also plays for Skënderbeu Korçë.

References

1988 births
Living people
Brazilian footballers
Kategoria Superiore players
Association football defenders
KF Skënderbeu Korçë players
Brazilian expatriate sportspeople in Albania
Expatriate footballers in Albania
Association football midfielders